The 2006 World Weightlifting Championships were held at the Handball Pavilion and Weightlifting Pavilion Dr. José Joaquín Puello in Santo Domingo, Dominican Republic. The event took place from September 30 to October 7, 2006.

Medal summary

Men

Women

Medal table
Ranking by Big (Total result) medals 

Ranking by all medals: Big (Total result) and Small (Snatch and Clean & Jerk)

Team ranking

Men

Women

Participating nations
484 competitors from 64 nations participated.

 (7)
 (8)
 (4)
 (7)
 (15)
 (1)
 (1)
 (15)
 (13)
 (9)
 (15)
 (14)
 (15)
 (5)
 (8)
 (4)
 (14)
 (12)
 (10)
 (3)
 (1)
 (15)
 (4)
 (9)
 (3)
 (13)
 (15)
 (6)
 (1)
 (1)
 (15)
 (15)
 (15)
 (3)
 (1)
 (5)
 (2)
 (6)
 (7)
 (2)
 (1)
 (1)
 (15)
 (4)
 (6)
 (15)
 (6)
 (1)
 (15)
 (15)
 (1)
 (1)
 (1)
 (15)
 (1)
 (4)
 (8)
 (1)
 (15)
 (15)
 (5)
 (14)
 (4)
 (1)

References 

Weightlifting World Championships Seniors Statistics

External links
Official website

 
World Weightlifting Championships
World Weightlifting Championships
World Weightlifting Championships
World Weightlifting Championships